Sawyer is an unincorporated community in Carlton County, Minnesota, United States.

The community is located between Carlton and Cromwell on State Highway 210 (MN 210).  Sawyer is located on the southern edge of the Fond du Lac Indian Reservation. It serves as one of three administrative centers of the reservation.

Sawyer is located 11 miles west of Cloquet; and 11 miles east of Cromwell.  The communities of Big Lake and Iverson are both nearby.

History
A post office called Sawyer has been in operation since 1891. The name Sawyer was selected by a railroad official. The historic Church of Sts. Joseph and Mary was built in 1884.

References

Further reading
 Rand McNally Road Atlas – 2007 edition – Minnesota entry
 Official State of Minnesota Highway Map – 2011/2012 edition
 Mn/DOT map of Carlton County – 2012 edition

Unincorporated communities in Minnesota
Unincorporated communities in Carlton County, Minnesota
Anishinaabe communities in the United States